Events from the year 1844 in the United States.

Incumbents

Federal Government 
 President: John Tyler (I-Virginia)
 Vice President: vacant
 Chief Justice: Roger B. Taney (Maryland)
 Speaker of the House of Representatives: John Winston Jones (D-Virginia)
 Congress: 28th

Events

 January 15 – The University of Notre Dame receives its charter from Indiana.
 March 12 – The Columbus and Xenia Railroad, the first railroad that is planned to be built in Ohio, is chartered.
 May 24 – The first electrical telegram is sent by Samuel F. B. Morse from the U.S. Capitol in Washington, D.C. to the B&O Railroad "outer depot" in Baltimore, Maryland, saying "What hath God wrought".
 June–July – The Great Flood of 1844 hits the Missouri River and Mississippi River.
 June 15 – Charles Goodyear receives a patent for vulcanization, a process to strengthen rubber.
 June 22 – Influential North American student fraternity Delta Kappa Epsilon is founded at Yale College.
 June 27 – Killing of Joseph Smith: Joseph Smith, founder of the Latter Day Saint movement, and his brother Hyrum are killed in Carthage Jail, Carthage, Illinois by an armed mob, leading to a succession crisis in the movement. John Taylor, future president of the Church of Jesus Christ of Latter-day Saints, is severely injured but survives; Willard Richards survives with a light wound.
 July 3 – The U.S. signs the Treaty of Wanghia with Qing dynasty China, the first diplomatic agreement between the two nations in history.
 July 25 – Exclusion Law in Oregon prohibits African Americans (including slaves) from entering or remaining in the territory
 August 8 – During a meeting held in Nauvoo, Illinois, the Quorum of the Twelve, headed by Brigham Young, is chosen as the leading body of the Church of Jesus Christ of Latter-day Saints.
 October 22 – The Great Disappointment: Millerites (including future members of the Seventh-day Adventist Church) find that the Second Coming of Jesus does not occur as predicted by preacher William Miller.
 December 4 – U.S. presidential election, 1844: James K. Polk defeats Henry Clay.
 Undated
 The first ever international cricket match is played in New York City between Canada and the United States.
 The United American Cemetery is founded in Cincinnati, Ohio.

Births
 March 12 – Patrick Collins, lawyer, 37th Mayor of Boston and U.S. Representatives from Massachusetts (died 1905)
 April 13 – John Surratt, suspected involvement in the assassination of Abraham Lincoln, son of Mary Surratt (died 1916)
 April 22 – Lewis Powell, conspirator with John Wilkes Booth, attempted assassin of William H. Seward (died 1865)
May 2 - Elijah McCoy, inventor of the automatic steam engine lubricator (died 1929)
 June 1 – John J. Toffey, Medal of Honor recipient (died 1911)
 June 3 – Garret Hobart, 24th Vice President of the United States from 1897 till 1899. (died 1899)
 July 9 – Charles D. Barney, stockbroker (died 1945)
 August 1 – Levi Ankeny, United States Senator from Washington from 1903 till 1909.  (died 1921)
 August 24 – Charles B. Clark, politician and entrepreneur (died 1891)
 October 11 – Henry J. Heinz, entrepreneur and founder of the H. J. Heinz Company (died 1919)
 Full date unknown:
 Edwin H. Tomlinson, world traveler and  benefactor (died 1938)

Deaths
 January 13 – Alexander Porter, United States Senator from Louisiana from 1833 till 1837. (born 1785)
 January 25 – Horace H. Hayden, first licensed American dentist (born 1769)
 February 27 – Nicholas Biddle, financier, last president of the Second Bank of the United States (born 1786)
 February 28 – 
Abel P. Upshur, Secretary of State from 1843 to 1844 (born 1790)
 Thomas W. Gilmer, fifteenth Secretary of the Navy (born 1802)
 March 6 – Gabriel Duvall, Justice of the U.S. Supreme Court from 1811 to 1835 (born 1752)
 May 18 – Richard McCarty, politician (born 1780)
 April 4 – Charles Bulfinch, architect of the Massachusetts State House (born 1763)
 April 21 – Henry Baldwin, Associate Justice of the US Supreme Court from 1830 till 1844. (born 1780)
 June 27  Joseph Smith Jr., religious leader and founder of Mormonism and the Latter Day Saint movement (born 1805)
 July 23 – Christian Gobrecht, third Chief Engraver of the United States Mint from 1840 to 1844 (born 1785)
 August 15 – William S. Fulton, United States Senator from Arkansas 1836 till 1844. (born 1795)
 September 14 – Oliver Holden, composer (born 1765)

See also
Timeline of United States history (1820–1859)

References

External links
 

 
1840s in the United States
United States
United States
Years of the 19th century in the United States